Aerolineas Mundo S.A. (also known as AMSA) was a cargo airline that operated from 1986 to 1993 out of Las Americas International Airport in Santo Domingo, Dominican Republic.

History
AMSA began as Air Mar Freighters in 1986, the creation of businessmen William Bailes Bachi and Filippo Deplana. AMSA flew various aircraft during its lifetime, including the C-54, DC-7, C-121, L-1049 and C-46.

Incidents and accidents
AMSA's co-owner, William Bailes Bachi, was killed in April 1990 when one of AMSA's aircraft had a ditching accident off Miami.
On February 3, 1992, a C-54 of the airline had a runway collision at Rafael Hernandez Airport in Aguadilla, Puerto Rico with a Lockheed Super Constellation, suffering a fire and being damaged beyond repair.

References

External links
 

Defunct cargo airlines
Airlines established in 1986
Airlines disestablished in 1993
1986 establishments in the Dominican Republic
Defunct airlines of the Dominican Republic
1993 disestablishments in the Dominican Republic